Kikki may refer to 

Kikki Danielsson, country, dansband and pop singer from Sweden
Kikki (album), a 1982 Kikki Danielsson album
Kikki, Balochistan, town in Pakistan
Kikki Benjamin, manga character; see list of Tokyo Mew Mew characters

See also
Kiki (disambiguation)

Feminine given names
Swedish feminine given names